Control Enthusiast is a comedy tour by British comedian Sarah Millican. The tour began on 8 February 2018 in Porthcawl, Wales at The Grand Pavilion, and concluded on 13 April 2019 in Calgary, Canada at the Bella Concert Hall. The tour consisted of 141 shows across Europe, Oceania and North America. A live recording of the tour was released on DVD in December 2018.

Critical reception 
Steve Bennett of Chortle gave a positive review of the Canterbury show, stating that Millican's "normality is key to her appeal [which allows] her audience see themselves reflected in her". He concluded by saying that Millican "excels" in her writing, "with plenty of acidic punchlines [within the show] to win over a crowd". Elle May Rice of The Liverpool Echo gave the Liverpool show three out of five stars and a mixed review, saying that it was "unashamedly filthy [and] shocking" yet criticised that "the show started shakily". However, Clive Davis of The Times gave the show a negative review, stating that "you [...] have to be a die-hard fan to enjoy her latest show, which rambles around familiar themes" and gave two out of five stars.

Tour dates

References

Comedy tours